is a train station in Akiha-ku, Niigata, Niigata Prefecture, Japan, operated by East Japan Railway Company (JR East).

Lines
Yashiroda Station is served by the Shin'etsu Main Line, and is 114.8 kilometers from the starting point of the line at Naoetsu Station.

Layout
The station consists of two ground-level side platforms, serving two tracks, with the station situated above the tracks. The station has a "Midori no Madoguchi" staffed ticket office.

Platforms

History
The station opened on 20 November 1897. With the privatization of Japanese National Railways (JNR) on 1 April 1987, the station came under the control of JR East. A new station building was completed in 2008.

Passenger statistics
In fiscal 2017, the station was used by an average of 1,064 passengers daily (boarding passengers only).

Surrounding area
 Niitsu Minami High School

 Kosudo district

See also
 List of railway stations in Japan

References

External links

 JR East station information 

Railway stations in Niigata (city)
Shin'etsu Main Line
Railway stations in Japan opened in 1897